Karlo Toth (15 July 1907 – 25 August 1988) was a Yugoslav wrestler. He competed in the men's Greco-Roman bantamweight at the 1936 Summer Olympics.

References

External links
 

1907 births
1988 deaths
Yugoslav male sport wrestlers
Olympic wrestlers of Yugoslavia
Wrestlers at the 1936 Summer Olympics
People from Bačka Topola